These are the official results of the Women's shot put event at the 1986 European Championships in Stuttgart, West Germany, held at Neckarstadion on 26 August 1986.

Medalists

Final

Participation
According to an unofficial count, 17 athletes from 9 countries participated in the event.

 (1)
 (2)
 (3)
 (1)
 (1)
 (3)
 (1)
 (2)
 (3)

See also
 1980 Women's Olympic Shot Put (Moscow)
 1983 Women's World Championships Shot Put (Helsinki)
 1984 Women's Olympic Shot Put (Los Angeles)
 1986 Shot Put Year Ranking
 1987 Women's World Championships Shot Put (Rome)
 1988 Women's Olympic Shot Put (Seoul)

References

 Results

Shot put
Shot put at the European Athletics Championships
1986 in women's athletics